Fortress Pass is a mountain pass in the central Baffin Mountains, Nunavut, Canada. It is named after Fortress Mountain.

References

Arctic Cordillera
Mountain passes of Baffin Island